The 2018–19 Florida Gulf Coast Eagles men's basketball team represented Florida Gulf Coast University in the 2018–19 NCAA Division I men's basketball season. The Eagles were led by first-year head coach Michael Fly and played their home games at Alico Arena in Fort Myers, Florida as members of the Atlantic Sun Conference.

Previous season 
The Eagles finished the 2017–18 season 23–12, 12–2 in ASUN play to win the ASUN regular season championship. In the ASUN tournament, they defeated USC Upstate and North Florida to advance to the championship game where they lost to Lipscomb. As a regular season conference champion who failed to win their conference tournament, they received an automatic bid to the National Invitation Tournament where they lost in the first round to Oklahoma State.

On April 4, 2018, head coach Joe Dooley left the school to become the head coach at East Carolina, where he was previously the head coach from 1995 to 1999. The following day, assistant head coach Michael Fly was promoted to head coach.

Roster

Schedule and results 

|-
!colspan=9 style=| Non-conference regular season

|-
!colspan=9 style=| Atlantic Sun Conference regular season

|-
!colspan=12 style=| Atlantic Sun tournament

Source:

References

Florida Gulf Coast Eagles men's basketball seasons
Florida Gulf Coast
Florida Gulf Coast
Florida Gulf Coast